1892 V may refer to:

206P/Barnard–Boattini, comet
351 Yrsa, asteroid